Banna Avenue is the main street of Griffith, New South Wales. The street is part of the state highway network as it incorporates the Kidman Way. The street is unusually long by country town standards, running from Benerembah Street, adjacent to the Griffith City Council chambers, to Mooreville, a commercial and industrial suburb it runs parallel with Yambil Street and Banna Lane. The street has a mix of national and local retailers.

Businesses and services
There are several department stores located along the road which include Kmart, Woolworths and Best & Less. Smaller stores include Just Jeans, Katies, Chain Reaction as well as various fast food outlets and service stations. Banna Avenue is equipped with most services, which include most of Griffith's banks, the city's post office, library and museums. There have been recent fears that Banna Avenue may face problems from major shopping centre developments outside of Banna Avenue, which include Griffith Central, Griffin Plaza and the Griffith Lifestyle Centre.

See also

 Kidman Way

Riverina
Roads in New South Wales